Rhipicera carinata is a species of beetle in the genus Rhipicera.

Taxonomic History 
This species was first described in 2013. The species epithet has been derived from the Latin "carinatus", keel shaped, in reference to the median longitudinal frontal carina. R. carinata closely resembles R. reichei but differs in the black femora and vertex usually bearing longitudinal ridge.

Distribution 
It is widely distributed and common in Western Australia and less common in South Australia.

Gallery

References

Beetles of Australia
Beetles described in 2013
Polyphaga